Jacob O. Wobbrock is a Professor in the University of Washington Information School and, by courtesy, in the Paul G. Allen School of Computer Science & Engineering at the University of Washington. He is Director of the ACE Lab, founding Co-Director of the CREATE center, and a founding member of the DUB Group and the MHCI+D degree program.

Wobbrock conducts research and teaches in the field of Human-Computer Interaction (HCI) with a focus on input and interaction techniques, human performance measurement and modeling, HCI research and design methods, mobile computing, and accessible computing. He frequently publishes on interaction techniques, text entry methods and their evaluation, gesture recognition and design, statistical methods and tools, mobile user interfaces, and accessible user interfaces, among other topics.

Wobbrock has co-authored over 200 peer-reviewed papers and received 28 paper awards, including seven best papers and eight honorable mentions from ACM's CHI conference. In 2021, he was named an ACM Fellow "for contributions to human-computer interaction and accessible computing." In 2019, he was inducted into the CHI Academy. For his work on accessible computing, he received the 2017 ACM SIGCHI Social Impact Award and the 2019 SIGACCESS ASSETS Paper Impact Award, a 10-year lasting impact award. He also received a 10-year impact award from ICMI 2022 for his work on the $P gesture recognizer. He is also the recipient of an NSF CAREER award and seven other National Science Foundation grants. In both 2018 and 2021, he was #1 of 100 on AMiner's Most Influential Scholars in HCI list, and was runner-up in 2020. (AMiner is an automatic citation-ranking system from Tsinghua University.) From 2012 to 2022, he served on the editorial board of ACM Transactions on Computer-Human Interaction. His advisees have gone on to positions at Harvard, Cornell, Colorado, Washington, Brown, Simon Fraser, Amazon, Apple, Google, and Microsoft, among others.

As an entrepreneur, Wobbrock was the venture-backed co-founder and CEO of AnswerDash from 2012 to 2015. AnswerDash was acquired by CloudEngage in June 2020.

Education 
Wobbrock grew up in Lake Oswego, Oregon and graduated with academic honors from Lake Oswego High School. He attended Stanford University, where he received his B.S. with Honors in Symbolic Systems (1998) and his M.S. in Computer Science (2000). In both degrees, he had a formal specialization in Human-Computer Interaction (HCI). After working in Silicon Valley startups for a few years, he attended the Human-Computer Interaction Institute in the School of Computer Science at Carnegie Mellon University, where he earned his Ph.D. (2006). At graduation, he was honored with CMU's School of Computer Science Distinguished Dissertation Award.

Research 
Wobbrock's research seeks to scientifically understand people's experiences of computers and information, and to improve those experiences by inventing new interactive technologies, especially for people with disabilities. His research topics include input and interaction techniques, human performance measurement and modeling, HCI research and design methods, mobile computing, and accessible computing.

Some of his notable research projects are the $-family gesture recognizers, the end-user elicitation design method, the Slide Rule design for accessible touchscreen gestures (which some have noted might have influenced Apple’s VoiceOver accessibility software design), the ARTool statistics tool for nonparametric ANOVA-type analyses, the Pointing Magnifier assistive pointing and visual aid, and the versatile EdgeWrite text-entry system. Wobbrock is also known for his formulation of Ability-Based Design, which scrutinizes technologies for their ability assumptions and insists that technologies accommodate people, rather than the other way around.

Teaching
Wobbrock teaches technical and design-oriented Human-Computer Interaction (HCI) subjects, and courses on research methods, statistics, and research design. He has also developed courses on experience design, interactive technology design, and input and interaction techniques. In February 2016, he launched Designing, Running, and Analyzing Experiments on the Coursera platform. This massive open online course (MOOC) focuses on experiment design and data analysis in the R programming language for formal Human-Computer Interaction studies.

Industry
Wobbrock was the venture-backed cofounder and CEO of AnswerDash, a SaaS startup that provides intelligent in-context help to websites and mobile apps. His co-founders were fellow professor Amy J. Ko and then-Ph.D. student Parmit Chilana, now a professor at Simon Fraser University. After running AnswerDash from 2012–2015, Wobbrock returned to his full-time academic position at the University of Washington. AnswerDash was acquired by CloudEngage in June 2020.

Between graduating from Stanford University and starting his Ph.D. at Carnegie Mellon University in 2001, Wobbrock worked at Silicon Valley startups DoDots and Google. While in college, he held two technical internships at Intel.

Personal life 
Wobbrock lives in Seattle, Washington and is married to Alison Wobbrock (née Pawluskiewicz), a daughter of Polish emigrants from Nowy Targ, Poland and the niece of celebrated Polish composer Jan Kanty Pawluskiewicz.

References

American computer scientists
Human–computer interaction researchers
Living people
1976 births